Kamloops Transit operates the public bus transit system in the City of Kamloops in south central British Columbia, Canada. The system consists of 18 regularly scheduled routes, one Sunday route, several school specials and handyDART customized service for those with a disability. Funding is provided through a partnership between the City of Kamloops and BC Transit, the provincial agency which plans and manages municipal transit systems. Operations are contracted out to FirstCanada ULC. The transit system began development in 1975 after the Province of British Columbia began offering subsidies to help operate local transit systems in local communities.

Regional Connections

The Kamloops Transit System primarily serves the city centre and immediate surroundings, though bus services are provided to Rayleigh and Heffley Creek, 13km and 20km distant from the city centre respectively. Transit connections to the Clearwater Transit System to Vinsulla, McLure, Barriere, Darfield, Little Fort, Blackpool, Clearwater, and Vavenby are offered twice weekly.

BC Transit Health Connections

Kamloops is part of the Health Connections network operated by BC Transit. These are intercity connections geared towards those in smaller communities needing access to larger health facilities, though all members of the public are welcome to use them if space is available. These services operate infrequently. Communities connected by these services directly to Kamloops are as follow:

 Ashcroft
 Cache Creek
 Chase
 Fountain Flats
 Kelowna
 Lillooet
 Lytton
 Logan Lake
 Merritt
 Pritchard
 Revelstoke
 Salmon Arm
 Savona
 Sicamous
 Sorrento
 Spences Bridge

City Bus Routes

References

External links
BC Transit: Kamloops

Transit agencies in British Columbia
Transport in Kamloops